The Battle of Bomarsund, in August 1854, took place during the Åland War, which was part of the Crimean War, when an Anglo-French expeditionary force attacked a Russian fortress. It was the only major action of the war to take place at Bomarsund in the Baltic Sea.

Background 
Bomarsund was a 19th-century fortress, the construction of which had started in 1832 by Russia in Sund, Åland, in the Baltic Sea. Bomarsund had not been completed (only two towers of the planned twelve subsidiary towers had been completed). When the war broke out the fortress remained vulnerable especially against forces attacking over land. Designers of the fortress had also assumed that narrow sea passages near the fortress would not be passable for large naval ships; while this assumption had held true during the time of sailing ships, it was possible for steam powered ships to reach weakly defended sections of the fortress.

First battle 
On 21 June 1854, three British ships bombarded the Bomarsund fortress. Artillery from the shore, however, responded and, while both sides suffered some damage, the casualties were light. The first battle was indecisive. During the battle, Charles Davis Lucas tossed a shell overboard which had landed on board. The shell exploded before it reached water. For saving his ship he was the first man to be awarded the Victoria Cross.

Second battle 
While the first battle had been a brief clash and artillery duel, the second battle was a different affair. By the end of July 1854, a British fleet of 25 ships had surrounded the fortress and only waited for the French ground troops to arrive. Both defender and attacker had acknowledged that the fort could not be defeated by naval forces alone and made preparations accordingly, Russian forces destroyed the surrounding countryside in an effort to force British and French forces to break away from the assumed siege.

On 8 August, a force of 7,000 French soldiers from the regiments Chasseurs de Vincennes, 2e Régiment d'Infanterie Légère, 3e Régiment d'Infanterie, 48e Régiment d'Infanterie and 51e Régiment d'Infanterie landed south of Bomarsund, while the remaining 2,000 French soldiers and a small force of 900 British marines landed on the north. Two days later the artillery landed; the British troops established a battery of three 32-pounder guns on a hill, the French establishing several batteries. On 13 August 1854, the French artillery opened fire on a tower and by the end of the day were in a position that while artillery suppressed the defenders of subsidiary tower of Brännklint, French infantry assaulted it. Defenders found their position to be hopeless and withdrew the bulk of their forces to the main fort leaving only a small detachment behind to supervise demolition of the tower. While French troops managed to capture the tower before it was demolished, it did not save the tower since the Russian artillery now opened fire at the captured tower and on 15 August 1854 scored a hit to the gunpowder magazines. The resulting explosion demolished the tower.

The bombardment of the main fortress started late on 15 August 1854 with land based guns and the navy opening fire. The second tower, Notvik, was also destroyed after British artillery opened fire from their hill opposite to the tower. With only a few guns capable of firing in the direction of the bombarding ships, the Russian forces hoped that the French and British forces would attack by land. However, after the bombardment continued into the 16 August without any indication of landings, it became apparent to the Russian commander that British and French intended to reduce the fortress with artillery fire. After eight hours of bombardment they managed to create a gaping hole in the fortress's walls. After most of the guns had been destroyed, the commandant of the tower surrendered to the British and French forces on 16 August 1854.

The early surrender came as a surprise to the French and British. 2,000 men laid down their arms and became prisoners.

Aftermath 

After the surrender, French and British forces demolished the fortress. British engineers remained until mid-September to ensure it could not be easily rebuilt. 700,000 bricks from it were brought in barges to Helsinki and then used in the construction of the Uspenski Cathedral.

Three hundred Finnish grenadiers defending the fortress were among the captured, and they were taken to Lewes to be imprisoned there until the end of the war. Upon the conclusion of the war they were released and given passage back to Finland, and they returned with a song about their experiences during the war, called the War of Åland ("Finnish: Oolannin sota, Swedish: "Det Åländska kriget). The Russian Memorial was erected in Lewes in 1877 to commemorate those who died while they were prisoners of war.

In the Treaty of Paris 1856, the entire Åland Islands were demilitarized, which is a status that has been preserved until this day.

The Bomarsund Bridge connects Bomarsund to Prästö.

Victoria Cross recipients 
In addition to Charles Davis Lucas several other Victoria Crosses were awarded in the Baltic Theater during the Crimean War.

Other VC recipients for action in the Baltic Sea:
 John Bythesea – 1854; Åland Islands
 William Johnstone – 1854; Åland Islands
 George Ingouville – 1855; Fort of Viborg
 George Dare Dowell – 1855; Fort of Viborg

References

External links 

 Bomarsund
 Bomarsund at the British Embassy site
 Photo of Bomarsund Fortress

Forts in Finland
History of Åland
Ruins in Finland
Conflicts in 1854
Battles of the Crimean War
Battles involving Finland
Battles involving France
Battles involving the United Kingdom
Sund, Åland
Coastal fortifications
Naval battles of the Crimean War
August 1854 events
Amphibious operations involving the United Kingdom